Chris Imes (born August 27, 1972), is an American former ice hockey player. He played for HK Olimpija, the Anchorage Aces, and the Minnesota Moose during his career. He also played for the American national team at the 1994 Winter Olympics and 1995 World Championships.

Imes played for the University of Maine Black Bears from 1990 to 1995. During his freshman and sophomore year at the University of Maine, Imes won the Shawn Walsh Defensive Player Award twice and helped guide Maine to their first NCAA Championship in 1992–93. In his senior year, Imes was a runner up for the Hobey Baker Award and was named the Hockey East Player of the Year in 1995. He was inducted into the University of Maine Sports Hall of Fame in 2003.

After retiring, Imes joined the Chicago Blues youth hockey organization as a director.

Career statistics

Regular season and playoffs

International

Awards and honors

References

External links
 

1972 births
American men's ice hockey defensemen
Anchorage Aces players
Florida Panthers draft picks
HDD Olimpija Ljubljana players
Ice hockey players at the 1994 Winter Olympics
Living people
Maine Black Bears men's ice hockey players
Minnesota Blue Ox players
Minnesota Moose players
National Hockey League supplemental draft picks
Olympic ice hockey players of the United States
People from Todd County, Minnesota
NCAA men's ice hockey national champions
AHCA Division I men's ice hockey All-Americans